Synanthedon flavicaudata is a moth of the family Sesiidae first described by Frederic Moore in 1887. It is found in India and Sri Lanka.

References

Moths of Asia
Moths described in 1887
Sesiidae